Goniobranchus loringi is a species of colourful sea slug, a dorid nudibranch, a marine gastropod mollusc in the family Chromodorididae. This species was transferred from Chromodoris to Goniobranchus in 2012.

Distribution
This species was described from Port Jackson, Australia. It is endemic to south-eastern Australia.

References

Chromodorididae
Gastropods described in 1864